Geoff Umbers (31 October 1933 – 16 August 2014) was an Australian rules footballer who played with Geelong in the Victorian Football League (VFL).

Notes

External links 

1933 births
2014 deaths
Australian rules footballers from Victoria (Australia)
Geelong Football Club players
Warrnambool Football Club players